David Lindsay-Abaire ( Abaire; born November 14, 1969) is an American playwright, lyricist and screenwriter. He received the Pulitzer Prize for Drama in 2007 for his play Rabbit Hole, which also earned several Tony Award nominations.

Early life and education
David Lindsay-Abaire was born David Abaire in Boston, Massachusetts, and grew up in South Boston. He attended Milton Academy and concentrated in theatre at Sarah Lawrence College, from which he graduated in 1992. He was accepted into the Lila Acheson Wallace American Playwrights Program at the Juilliard School, where he wrote under the tutelage of playwrights Marsha Norman and Christopher Durang from 1996 to 1998.

Career
Lindsay-Abaire had his first theatrical success with Fuddy Meers, which was workshopped as part of the National Playwrights Conference at the Eugene O'Neill Theatre Center in 1998 under Artistic Director Lloyd Richards. The play premiered Off-Broadway at the Manhattan Theatre Club, running from November 2, 1999, to January 2000 and transferred to the Minetta Lane Theatre on January 27, 2000, closing in April 2000 after 16 previews and 78 performances there. He returned to the Manhattan Theatre Club in 2001 with Wonder of the World, starring Sarah Jessica Parker, about a wife who suddenly leaves her husband and hops a bus to Niagara Falls in search of freedom, enlightenment, and the meaning of life.

Lindsay-Abaire also wrote Kimberly Akimbo (2000), Dotting and Dashing (1999), Snow Angel (1999), and A Devil Inside (Off-Broadway, 1997). Among his early short plays, he wrote The Li'l Plays (1997-1999) which are five comedic plays, each 10–15 minutes in length.

His play Rabbit Hole premiered in 2006 on Broadway with Cynthia Nixon, Tyne Daly, and John Slattery, and won the 2007 Pulitzer Prize for Drama. It was nominated for a Tony Award for Best Play, as well as other Tony awards, and Cynthia Nixon won the 2006 Tony Award as Best Actress.

He wrote the book for the musical High Fidelity, which ran on Broadway in December 2006.

He wrote the book and lyrics for the musical Shrek the Musical which ran on Broadway from November 8, 2008 (previews) to January 3, 2010, with Lindsay-Abaire receiving a 2009 Tony Award nomination for Book of a Musical and in the West End in May 2011. The musical ran for 441 performances on Broadway.

Good People officially opened on Broadway on March 3, 2011, with Frances McDormand and Tate Donovan in the lead roles. The play was nominated for the 2011 Tony Award, Best Play and won the 2011 Tony Award, Actress in a Play for McDormand.

His play Ripcord opened Off-Broadway on October 20, 2015, at the Manhattan Theatre Club in a limited engagement. Directed by David Hyde Pierce, the cast features Marylouise Burke, Rachel Dratch, Glenn Fitzgerald, and Holland Taylor. The play focuses on two roommates in a retirement home, who according to Variety "devise dirty tricks...to torment one another."

Among his influences, Lindsay-Abaire said: "I love Chris's [Durang] work. And I don't think there's been a piece written about me that hasn't mentioned the fact that he and I live in the same world. But I think I've also been influenced by John Guare and Tina Howe and older folks like Feydeau and Ionesco and Joe Orton."

Lindsay-Abaire has received commissions from Dance Theater Workshop and the Jerome Foundation. He has received awards from the Berilla Kerr Foundation, the Lincoln Center LeComte du Nuoy Fund, Mixed Blood Theater, Primary Stages, the Eugene O'Neill Theatre Center, the Tennessee Williams/ New Orleans Literary Festival, and the South Carolina Playwrights Festival.

Film
Lindsay-Abaire wrote the screenplay of the 2010 film adaptation of his play Rabbit Hole, which starred Nicole Kidman. His other screenplays have tended to be in the children's fantasy and science fiction genres, including the animated film Robots (2005), written with Lowell Ganz and Babaloo Mandel, Inkheart (2008), based on the novel of the same name, the animated film Rise of the Guardians (2012), based on a story by co-director William Joyce, and Oz the Great and Powerful (2013), written with Mitchell Kapner. He also wrote the screenplay for the 2015 horror remake Poltergeist.

Personal life
Lindsay-Abaire and his wife, Christine, live in Brooklyn, New York. In 2016, Lindsay-Abaire was named co-director of Juilliard's Lila Acheson Wallace American Playwrights Program.

Theatre works (selected)
 A Devil Inside – 1997, Off-Broadway
 Fuddy Meers – 1999, Off-Broadway
 Snow Angel – 1999, Regional
 Kimberly Akimbo – 2000, Off-Broadway
 Wonder of the World – 2001, Off-Broadway
 Rabbit Hole – 2006, Broadway
 High Fidelity (musical) – 2006, Broadway
 Shrek the Musical (musical) – 2008, Broadway
 Good People – 2011, Broadway
 Ripcord – 2015, Off-Broadway
 Kimberly Akimbo (musical) – 2021, Off-Broadway

References

External links
 
 
 

1969 births
20th-century American dramatists and playwrights
Living people
Milton Academy alumni
Writers from Boston
Pulitzer Prize for Drama winners
Sarah Lawrence College alumni
Juilliard School alumni
American male screenwriters
American male dramatists and playwrights
Animation screenwriters
People from South Boston
20th-century American male writers
Screenwriters from Massachusetts
People from Brooklyn